Phestilla poritophages is a species of sea slug, an aeolid nudibranch, a marine gastropod mollusk in the family Trinchesiidae. The species was named after its prey genus, the hard coral Porites.

Distribution
This species was described from 1 km south of Kunduchi, Tanzania.

References 

Trinchesiidae
Gastropods described in 1979
Invertebrates of Tanzania